North Parish Church is a historic church in North Andover, Massachusetts. It was designed by Richard Bond (architect) and built in 1836. The building's architecture is called Cardboard Gothic architecture. It is located at 190 Academy Road.

References

External links
 The North Parish of North Andover - official site

Churches completed in 1836
Buildings and structures in North Andover, Massachusetts
Unitarian Universalist churches in Massachusetts
Churches in Essex County, Massachusetts